Tipasa renalis is a moth of the family Noctuidae first described by Frederic Moore in 1885. It is found in Sri Lanka, Taiwan and Borneo.

A subapical dark brown triangle is found on the costa. An irregular, pale zigzag submarginal encloses a dark brown area in the interior half of the marginal zone.

References

Moths of Asia
Moths described in 1885